Malleco may refer to

Things in Chile
Malleco Province
Malleco River
Malleco Viaduct

Other
Malleco (moth), a moth genus